Matteo Angeli (born 30 December 2002) is a professional Italian footballer who plays as a defender for  club Renate on loan from Bologna.

Career

Early career 
At the start of his career, he played in the youth sectors of Cuneo and Torino before moving to Milan in 2018.

Imolese 
On 28 August 2020 he moved to Imolese. On 16 January 2021, he made his debut into professional football in the 2–0 win against Matelica.

Bologna
On 6 July 2022, Angeli signed with Serie A club Bologna. After remaining on the bench in the first three games of the 2022–23 Serie A season, on 30 August 2022 Angeli moved on loan to Renate.

Career statistics

References 

2002 births
People from Cuneo
Sportspeople from the Province of Cuneo
Footballers from Piedmont
Living people
Italian footballers
Association football defenders
Serie C players
Torino F.C. players
A.C. Milan players
Imolese Calcio 1919 players
Bologna F.C. 1909 players
A.C. Renate players